Below is a list of Canadian plants by genus.  Due to the vastness of Canada's biodiversity, this page is divided.

Many of the plants seen in Canada are introduced, either intentionally or accidentally.  N indicated native and X indicated exotic.  Those plants whose status is unknown are marked with a ?.

A | B | C | D | E | F | G | H | I J K | L | M | N | O | P Q | R | S | T | U V W | X Y Z

Ba 

 Ballota
 X Ballota nigra
 Baptisia
 X Baptisia australis
 N Baptisia tinctoria — yellow wild-indigo
 Barbarea
 N Barbarea orthoceras — erect-fruit wintercress
 X Barbarea vulgaris — yellow rocket, common wintercress
 Bartonia
 N Bartonia paniculata subsp. paniculata — twining screwstem, branched bartonia Threatened
 N Bartonia virginica — yellow screwstem, yellow bartonia
 Bartsia
 N Bartsia alpina — velvetbells, alpine bartsia
 Bassia
 X Bassia hyssopifolia

Be 

 Beckmannia
 N Beckmannia syzigachne — American slough grass
 Bellis
 X Bellis perennis — English daisy
 Berberis
 X Berberis aquifolium — Oregon grape, Oregon hollygrape, holly barberry
 X Berberis repens
 X Berberis thunbergii — Japanese barberry, purple Japanese barberry
 X Berberis vulgaris — European barberry, common barberry
 X Berberis × ottawensis (B. thunbergii × B. vulgaris) — Ottawa barberry
 Berteroa
 X Berteroa incana — hoary alyssum, hoary false madwort
 Berula
 N Berula erecta
 Betula
 N Betula alleghaniensis — yellow birch
 N Betula cordifolia — heartleaf birch, mountain white birch, mountain paper birch
 N Betula glandulosa — American dwarf birch, glandular birch, scrub birch, dwarf resin birch, resin birch, tundra dwarf birch
 N Betula lenta — sweet birch, cherry birch
 N Betula minor — dwarf white birch
 N Betula neoalaskana — Alaska birch, Alaskan paper birch, Alaska white birch
 N Betula occidentalis — water birch, western birch, western river birch, spring birch
 N Betula papyrifera — paper birch, white birch, canoe birch
 X Betula pendula — European white birch, weeping birch, silver birch
 N Betula populifolia — grey birch, fire birch, old field birch, poverty birch
 X Betula pubescens — downy birch, European white birch
 N Betula pumila — dwarf birch, bog birch, swamp birch
 N Betula × neoborealis (B. occidentalis × B. pumila)
 N Betula × purpusii (B. alleghaniensis × B. pumila)
 N Betula × sandbergii (B. papyrifera × B. pumila) — Sandberg's birch
 N Betula × sargentii (B. glandulosa × B. pumila) — Sargent's birch

Bi 

 Bidens
 X Bidens aristosa — tickseed beggarticks
 X Bidens bipinnata
 N Bidens cernua — nodding beggarticks, nodding burr marigold
 N Bidens connata — purplestem beggarticks, purplestem swamp beggarticks, connate beggarticks, southern tickseed
 N Bidens discoidea — swamp beggarticks, small beggarticks, discoid beggarticks, few-bracted beggarticks
 N Bidens frondosa — Devil's beggarticks, Devil's pitchfork, stick-tight, largeleaf beggarticks
 N Bidens hyperborea — estuary beggarticks, coastal beggarticks, northern estuarine beggarticks, seacliff beggarticks
 N Bidens laevis — smooth bur-marigold
 X Bidens pilosa — hairy beggarticks
 X Bidens polylepis — awnless beggarticks
 N Bidens tripartita — threepart beggarticks, trifid burr-marigold
 N Bidens vulgata — tall beggarticks, stick-tight, big Devil's beggarticks

Bl 

 Blephilia
 N Blephilia ciliata — downy woodmint
 N Blephilia hirsuta — hairy woodmint
 Blysmus
 N Blysmus rufus — red bulrush

Bo 

 Boehmeria
 N Boehmeria cylindrica — false nettle, bog-hemp, smallspike false nettle
 Bolboschoenus
 N Bolboschoenus fluviatilis — river bulrush, river clubrush
 N Bolboschoenus maritimus — saltmarsh bulrush, bayonet grass, saltmarsh clubrush
 Borago
 X Borago officinalis — common borage, beeplant, beebread
 Botrychium
 N Botrychium acuminatum — pointed moonwort
 N Botrychium ascendens — upswept moonwort, triangle-lobed moonwort
 N Botrychium campestre — prairie moonwort, prairie dunewort
 N Botrychium dissectum — lacyleaf grapefern, cutleaf grapefern, cutleaf moonwort
 N Botrychium hesperium — western moonwort
 N Botrychium lanceolatum — lanceleaf grapefern, triangle moonwort
 N Botrychium lunaria — common moonwort, moonwort grapefern
 N Botrychium matricariifolium — daisyleaf moonwort, matricary grapefern, matricary moonwort, chamomile grapefern
 N Botrychium minganense — Mingan's moonwort
 N Botrychium multifidum — leathery grapefern
 N Botrychium oneidense — Lake Oneida grapefern, blunt-lobed grapefern
 N Botrychium pallidum — pale moonwort
 N Botrychium pseudopinnatum — false northwestern moonwort
 N Botrychium rugulosum — St. Lawrence grapefern, rugulose grapefern, ternate grapefern
 N Botrychium simplex — little grapefern, least moonwort
 N Botrychium spathulatum — spatulate moonwort, spoonleaf moonwort
 N Botrychium virginianum — rattlesnake fern
 Bouteloua
 N Bouteloua curtipendula — sideoats grama

Br 

 Brachyelytrum
 N Brachyelytrum erectum var. erectum — bearded shorthusk
 N Brachyelytrum erectum var. glabratum — northern shorthusk
 Brasenia
 N Brasenia schreberi — watershield, purple wendock
 Brassica
 X Brassica juncea — Chinese mustard, Indian mustard,  brown mustard, leaf mustard, Sarepta mustard
 X Brassica napus — rutabaga, canola, Swedish turnip, rapeseed, colza, oilseed rape, annual rape
 X Brassica nigra — black mustard
 X Brassica oleracea — cabbage, cauliflower, broccoli, kale, brussels sprouts, kohlrabi, chou broccoli
 Braya
 N Braya humilis — low northern rockcress, low braya
 Briza
 X Briza maxima — big quaking grass, large quaking grass
 X Briza media — perennial quaking grass
 Bromus
 X Bromus aleutensis — Aleut brome
 X Bromus arvensis — field brome
 X Bromus briziformis — rattlesnake brome
 X Bromus carinatus — California brome
 N Bromus ciliatus — fringed brome
 X Bromus commutatus — meadow brome, hairy brome
 X Bromus danthoniae — oat brome
 X Bromus erectus — erect brome, upright brome, meadow brome
 X Bromus hordeaceus — soft brome
 X Bromus inermis subsp. inermis — smooth brome, Hungarian brome, awnless brome
 N Bromus kalmii — Kalm's brome, prairie brome, wild chess
 N Bromus latiglumis — broad-glumed brome
 N Bromus nottowayanus — Nottoway brome grass
 N Bromus pubescens — hairy woodland brome
 N Bromus pumpellianus subsp. pumpellianus — Pumpell's brome
 X Bromus racemosus — spiked brome
 X Bromus secalinus — rye brome, cheat, chess
 X Bromus squarrosus — corn brome
 X Bromus sterilis — poverty brome
 X Bromus tectorum — cheat grass
 X Bromus × pseudothominii (B. hordeaceus × B. lepidus) — soft brome

Bu 

 Buchnera
 N Buchnera americana — bluehearts  Endangered 
 Buddleja
 X Buddleja davidii — butterfly bush, orange-eye, summer lilac
 Buglossoides
 X Buglossoides arvensis — corn gromwell, bastard alkanet
 Bulbostylis
 N Bulbostylis capillaris
 Bupleurum
 X Bupleurum rotundifolium — roundleaf thorowax
 Butomus
 X Butomus umbellatus — flowering rush

References 

See: Flora of Canada#References